Crickets: Best of the Fading Captain Series 1999–2007 is a collection of songs from releases in the Fading Captain Series of Dayton, Ohio rock group Guided by Voices.

CD1
Tight Globes - Robert Pollard/Doug Gillard
Total Exposure - Airport 5
Death of the Party - The Keene Brothers
Festival of Death - Circus Devils
Break Some Concentration - Psycho And The Birds
Beaten by the Target - The Moping Swans
Built to Improve - Robert Pollard
Flings of the Wastecoat Crowd - Robert Pollard
Never Forget Where You Get Them - Go Back Snowball
Stifled Man Casino - Airport 5
Bull Spears - Circus Devils
White Gloves Come Off - Robert Pollard
Time Machines - Lexo & The Leapers
Alone, Stinking and Unafraid - Lexo & The Leapers
Sensational Gravity Boy - Freedom Cruise
Dolphins of Color - Circus Devils
Fairly Blacking Out - The Takeovers
Naked Wall, The - The Keene Brothers
Do Something Real - Robert Pollard/Doug Gillard
It Is Divine - Go Back Snowball
I'm Dirty - Howling Wolf Orchestra
However Young They Are - Airport 5
Look at Your Life - The Moping Swans
Harrison Adams - Robert Pollard
All Men Are Freezing - Robert Pollard
Sister I Need Wine - Guided By Voices
I'm Gonna Miss My Horse - Ellsworth Pollard
Butcherman - Psycho

CD2
Zoom (It Happens All Over the World) - Robert Pollard
First of an Early Go Getter - Lifeguards
Correcto - Circus Devils
Pop Zeus - Robert Pollard/Doug Gillard
First Spill Is Free - The Takeovers
Instrument Beetle - Robert Pollard/Soft Rock Renegades
Bunco Men - Elf God
Selective Service - Guided By Voices
Soldiers of June - Circus Devils
Remain Lodging (At Airport 5) - Airport 5
Island of Lost Lucys - The Keene Brothers
Feathering Clueless (The Exotic Freebird) - Airport 5
Suffer the Sun - Psycho And The Birds
Vault of Moons, The - Robert Pollard
Trial of Affliction and Light Sleeping - Robert Pollard
Children Come On - Robert Pollard
(No) Hell For Humor - Circus Devils
Society Dome - Lifeguards
7th Level Shutdown - Robert Pollard/Soft Rock Renegades
Her Noise - Circus Devils
Dumbluck Systems Stormfront - Go Back Snowball
Frequent Weaver Who Burns - Robert Pollard/Doug Gillard
Town of Mirrors - Robert Pollard
Powerblessings - Robert Pollard
Island Crimes - Robert Pollard
Lugnut Blues - Alien Mofo
You've Taken Me In - Little Bobby Pop
Power of Suck, The - Radiation Feeder

2007 compilation albums
Guided by Voices compilation albums